Ronald Thompson (born 1969) is an American former college basketball player and coach and current Emmy Award-winning broadcaster for Comcast SportsNet, based in Bethesda, Maryland. He is the son of Gwen Thompson and former Georgetown University head coach John R. Thompson, Jr., whose children also include a daughter, Tiffany, and John Thompson III, who also is a former Georgetown head coach.

Born in Washington, D.C., Thompson spent his formative years on basketball courts in the Boys & Girls Clubs throughout the Washington metropolitan area. He contributed on Amateur Athletic Union (AAU) teams in the Washington, D.C, region and played high school basketball for coach Stu Vetter at Flint Hill School in Oakton, Virginia. In 1992, Thompson graduated from Georgetown University as a four-year basketball letterman with a degree in sociology. After a brief stint as a trading assistant with Prudential Securities in New York City, he became an assistant coach, first at the University of Oregon from 1993 to 1994, then with Loyola College in Maryland from 1994 to 1996. His career in professional sports began as a video coordinator for Hall of Fame coach Larry Brown and the Philadelphia 76ers of the National Basketball Association (NBA) in 1996; shortly afterward, he became a 76ers scout. In 1998, Thompson returned to Georgetown as an assistant coach under his father from 1998 to 1999 and then under head coach Craig Esherick from 1999 to 2003. He then was an assistant coach at the University of Arkansas at Fayetteville, Arkansas from 2003 to 2006.

Thompson accepted the head coaching job at Ball State University in April 2006. In his one season as coach of the Cardinals they finished a disappointing 9-22. Following the season, controversy developed surrounding a potential NCAA investigation into the basketball coaching staff attending voluntary player workouts outside of the regulated practice dates. The Ball State newspaper reported  that on Sunday, June 24, 2007, "men's basketball coach Ronny Thompson was greeted at his office with seven note cards that simply read 'liars, cheaters, [racial slur].'" Thompson resigned as men's basketball coach in July 2007, later claiming that he had been in a "racially hostile work environment." Ball State later exonerated Thompson of rules violations, apologized, and awarded him a $200,000 settlement. "In return, Thompson agreed to waive all claims he may have against the university and that nothing in the settlement constitutes an admission of liability or illegality by either party."

Thompson joined Comcast SportsNet in 2007, offering pre-game/postgame analysis for the Washington Wizards and color commentary for college games. He also hosted the series My Life 365 with Ron Thompson, which featured interviews with the preeminent athletes and media figures of the United States. His subjects included sports/media moguls Ted Leonsis and Sheila Johnson, former Duke University swingman Grant Hill, Georgetown Hoyas teammate Alonzo Mourning, and legendary Hoyas guard Allen Iverson;Thompson received an Emmy for the latter interview. Thompson also conducted a rare, exclusive interview with Los Angeles Lakers guard Kobe Bryant months before he helped the Lakers secure their seventeenth franchise title. In the summer of 2010, Thompson served as director of the Kobe Bryant/Nike Summer Basketball Camp which toured China.

Thompson is also a contributor to NBA TV and occasionally served as guest-host for his father's The John Thompson Show, which was broadcast daily on-air/online on ESPN Radio until ending its run in February 2012.

Head coaching record

See also
 1988–89 Georgetown Hoyas men's basketball team
 1989–90 Georgetown Hoyas men's basketball team
 1990–91 Georgetown Hoyas men's basketball team
 1991–92 Georgetown Hoyas men's basketball team

References

1969 births
Living people
American men's basketball players
Arkansas Razorbacks men's basketball coaches
Ball State Cardinals men's basketball coaches
Basketball coaches from Washington, D.C.
Basketball players from Washington, D.C.
Georgetown Hoyas men's basketball coaches
Georgetown Hoyas men's basketball players
Loyola Greyhounds men's basketball coaches
Oregon Ducks men's basketball coaches